The Group 4: Experimental sciences subjects of the International Baccalaureate Diploma Programme comprise the main scientific emphasis of this internationally recognized high school programme. They consist of seven courses, five of which are offered at both the Standard Level (SL) and Higher Level (HL): Chemistry, Biology, Physics, Design Technology, and, as of August 2012, Computer Science (previously a group 5 elective course) is offered as part of the Group 4 subjects. There are also two SL only courses: a transdisciplinary course, Environmental Systems and Societies, that satisfies Diploma requirements for Groups 3 and 4, and Sports, Exercise and Health Science (previously, for last examinations in 2013, a pilot subject). Astronomy also exists as a school-based syllabus. Students taking two or more Group 4 subjects may combine any of the aforementioned.

The Chemistry, Biology, Physics and Design Technology courses will be updated for first teaching in September 2014, with syllabus updates (including a decrease in the number of options), a new internal assessment component similar to that of the Group 5 (mathematics) explorations, and "a new concept-based approach" dubbed "the nature of science". A new, standard level-only course will also be introduced to cater to candidates who do not wish to further their studies in the sciences, focusing on important concepts in Chemistry, Biology and Physics.

Structure and assessment
All group 4 subjects (except computer science and environmental systems and societies; see below) follow roughly the same format. Each subject has its Subject Specific Core (SSC), i.e., material taught at both the standard and higher levels. Students sitting the Higher Level examination study the Additional Higher Level (AHL) material. Lastly, there is a list of options for each subject from which two are chosen. Higher Level students are sometimes unable to choose certain options that are available to Standard Level students because the AHL already covers it. Ideally, students choose the options based on their own abilities and preferences, but in practice the options are usually chosen by the school (based on the school's scientific facilities as well as the discretion of the instructor). Students spend one-quarter of the 150 hours of SL instruction (240 hours for HL; however, both numbers are merely recommendations and are not enforced) doing practical work in the laboratory. Group 4 subjects at the Standard Level are tailored for students who do not see themselves in further science instruction after leaving the programme.

Assessment of a Group 4 subject comprises the following:
Internal assessment of the practical work (24%)
Paper 1 – multiple choice questions on the SSC (20%)
Paper 2 – free response questions on the SSC (32% at SL, 36% at HL)
Paper 3 – free response questions on the options (24% at SL, 20% at HL)

At the Standard Level, the examinations are respectively 45 minutes, 1 hour and 15 minutes, and 1 hour long. At the Higher Level, they are 1 hour, 2 hours and 15 minutes, and 1 hour and 15 minutes long. Calculators are not permitted for Paper 1, but they (as well as a provided formula booklet and periodic table) are permitted for papers 2 and 3.

Subjects

Physics (2009–current)

Standard level
80 hours of instruction on 8 topics
 Physics and physical measurement
 Mechanics
 Thermal physics
 Oscillations and waves
 Electric currents
 Fields and forces
 Atomic and nuclear physics
 Energy, power and climate change
with 30 hours of instruction on two optional subjects:
 Sight and wave phenomena
 Quantum physics and nuclear physics
 Digital technology
 Relativity and particle physics
 Astrophysics
 Communications
 Electromagnetic Waves
and 40 hours of practical work.

Higher level
80 hours on Physics SL core subjects, with 55 hours on 6 additional topics:
 Motion in fields
 Thermal physics
 Wave phenomena
 Electromagnetic induction
 Quantum physics and nuclear physics
 Digital technology
and 45 hours of instruction on two optional subjects:
 Astrophysics
 Communications
 Electromagnetic Waves
 Relativity
 Medical Physics
 Particle Physics
and 60 hours of practical work.

Physics (2016–2022)

Topics

SL/HL core
 Topic 1: Measurements and uncertainties (5 hours)
 Topic 2: Mechanics (22 hours)
 Topic 3: Thermal physics (11 hours)
 Topic 4: Waves (15 hours)
 Topic 5: Electricity and magnetism (15 hours)
 Topic 6: Circular motion and gravitation (5 hours)
 Topic 7: Atomic, nuclear and particle physics (14 hours)
 Topic 8: Energy production (8 hours)

HL extension
 Topic 9: Wave phenomena (17 hours)
 Topic 10: Fields (11 hours)
 Topic 11: Electromagnetic induction (16 hours)
 Topic 12: Quantum and nuclear physics (16 hours)

Options
 Option A: Relativity (15/25 hours)
 Option B: Engineering physics (15/25 hours)
 Option C: Imaging (15/25 hours)
 Option D: Astrophysics (15/25 hours)

Chemistry (2009–2015)

Standard level
80 hours of instruction on the topics:
 Quantitative Chemistry
 Atomic structure
 Periodicity 
 Bonding
 Energetics 
 Kinetics 
 Equilibrium 
 Acids and Bases 
 Oxidation and reduction 
 Organic chemistry 
 Measurement and data processing
and 30 hours on two options from the topics:
 Modern analytical chemistry
 Human Biochemistry
 Chemistry in industry and technology
 Medicines and drugs
 Environmental Chemistry
 Food chemistry
 Further Organic Chemistry
together with 40 hours of practical work.

Higher level
80 hours on the core subjects of the Standard level course with 55 hours of instruction on these topics:
 Atomic structure 
 Periodicity 
 Bonding 
 Energetics 
 Kinetics 
 Equilibrium
 Acids and Bases 
 Oxidation and reduction 
 Organic chemistry 
and 45 hours on two of the options in the standard course, and 60 hours of practical work.

Chemistry (2016–2022)

Topics

SL/HL core and HL extension
 Topic 1: Stoichiometric relationships (13.5 hours)
 Topic 2 + 12: Atomic structure (6/8 hours)
 Topic 3 + 13: Periodicity (6/10 hours)
 Topic 4 + 14: Chemical bonding and structure (13.5/20.5 hours)
 Topic 5 + 15: Energetics/thermochemistry (9/16 hours)
 Topic 6 + 16: Chemical kinetics (7/13 hours)
 Topic 7 + 17: Equilibrium (4.5/8.5 hours)
 Topic 8 + 18: Acids and bases (6.5/16.5 hours)
 Topic 9 + 19: Redox processes (8/14 hours)
 Topic 10 + 20: Organic chemistry (11/23 hours)
 Topic 11 + 21: Measurement and data processing (10/12 hours)

Options
 Option A: Materials (15/25 hours)
 Option B: Biochemistry (15/25 hours)
 Option C: Energy (15/25 hours)
 Option D: Medicinal chemistry (15/25 hours)

Biology (2009–2015)
Biology is the science of life and living organisms. Aside from instruction relevant to this, students are given the chance to learn complex laboratory techniques (e.g., DNA extraction) as well as develop mindful opinions about controversial topics in biology (e.g., stem-cell research and genetic modification). The syllabus lists thirteen topics, to be covered in an order varying from school to school:

Standard level
80 hours of instruction on 6 topics

Statistical Analysis
Cells
Chemistry of Life
Genetics
Ecology and evolution
Health and human physiology

with 30 hours of instruction on two options from:

Human nutrition and health
 Physiology of exercise
Cells and energy
Evolution
Neurobiology and behavior
Microbes and Biotechnology
Ecology and conservation

Higher level
80 hours of instruction on 6 topics in the standard course and 55 hours on a further 5 topics:
Nucleic acids and proteins
Cellular respiration and photosynthesis
Plant Science
Genetics
Human health and physiology

with 45 hours of instruction on addition topics in the SL course plus:
Further human physiology

Biology (2016–2022)

Topics

SL/HL core
 Topic 1: Cell biology (15 hours)
 Topic 2: Molecular biology (21 hours)
 Topic 3: Genetics (15 hours)
 Topic 4: Ecology (12 hours)
 Topic 5: Evolution and biodiversity (12 hours)
 Topic 6: Human physiology (20 hours)

HL extension
 Topic 7: Nucleic acids (9 hours)
 Topic 8: Metabolism, cell respiration and photosynthesis (14 hours)
 Topic 9: Plant biology (13 hours)
 Topic 10: Genetics and evolution (8 hours)
 Topic 11: Animal physiology (16 hours)

Options
 Option A: Neurology and behaviour (15/25 hours)
 Option B: Biotechnology and bioinformatics (15/25 hours)
 Option C: Ecology and conservation (15/25 hours)
 Option D: Human physiology (15/25 hours)

Design technology (2009–2015)
Topics addressed in this course include:
Design process
Product innovation
Green design
Materials
Product development
Product design
Evaluation
with additional topics in the higher level:
Energy
Structures
Mechanical design
Advanced manufacturing techniques
Sustainable development.

Design technology (2016–2022)

Topics

SL/HL core
 Topic 1: Human factors and ergonomics (12 hours)
 Topic 2: Resource management and sustainable production (22 hours)
 Topic 3: Modelling (12 hours)
 Topic 4: Raw material to final product (23 hours)
 Topic 5: Innovation and design (13 hours)
 Topic 6: Classic design (8 hours)

HL extension
 Topic 7: User-centred design (UCD) (12 hours)
 Topic 8: Sustainability (14 hours)
 Topic 9: Innovation and markets (13 hours)
 Topic 10: Commercial production (15 hours)

Sport, exercise and health science (2014–2020)

Topics

Core 
All candidates study the 6 core topics (80 hours):
 Topic 1: Anatomy (7 hours)
 Topic 2: Exercise physiology (17 hours)
 Topic 3: Energy systems (13 hours)
 Topic 4: Movement analysis (15 hours)
 Topic 5: Skill in sport (15 hours)
 Topic 6: Measurement and evaluation of human performance (13 hours)

Options 
In addition, they also study two of the following four options (30 hours):
 Option A: Optimizing physiological performance (15 hours)
 Option B: Psychology of sport (15 hours)
 Option C: Physical activity and health (15 hours)
 Option D: Nutrition for sport, exercise and health (15 hours)

Environmental systems and societies (2010–2016)

Topics
All topics are compulsory (i.e. there are no options).
Topic 1: Systems and models (5 hours)
Topic 2: The ecosystem (31 hours)
Topic 3: Human population, carrying capacity and resource use (39 hours)
Topic 4: Conservation and biodiversity (15 hours)
Topic 5: Pollution management (18 hours)
Topic 6: The issue of global warming (6 hours)
Topic 7: Environmental value systems (6 hours)
The remaining 30 hours are derived from the internal assessment (practical work), making a total of 150 teaching hours.

Assessment
There are two external assessment components and one internal assessment component.

External assessment
Calculators are required for both papers.
 Paper 1 (45 raw marks contributing 30% of the course, 1 hour) consists of short-answer and data-based questions.
 Paper 2 (65 raw marks contributing 50% of the course, 2 hours) consists of:
 Section A: Candidates are required to analyse and make reasoned and balanced judgements relating to a range of data on a specific unseen case study.
 Section B: Candidates are required to answer two structured essay questions from a choice of four.

Internal assessment
Candidates will need to complete 30 hours of practical work throughout the course. Each of the three criteria - planning (Pl), data collection and processing (DCP) and discussion, evaluation and conclusion (DEC) - are assessed twice, while the fourth criterion - personal skills (PS) - is assessed summatively throughout the course. The maximum raw mark is 42, which contributes 20% of the course.

Computer science (2014–2020)

The computer science course was recently updated and moved from Group 5 (as an elective course) to Group 4, becoming a full course, from first examinations in 2014. The structure and assessment of the course has changed to greater emphasize problem solving rather than Java program construction. The curriculum model for the course still differs from other Group 4 subjects however.

Topics
Standard Level candidates study the SL/HL core (80 hours) and the core of one option (30 hours), while Higher Level candidates study the SL/HL core (80 hours), HL extension (45 hours), an annually-issued case study (30 hours) and the whole of one option (30 + 15 hours). The remaining 40 hours for both Standard and Higher Level comes from the internal assessment component, for a total of 150 teaching hours at SL and 240 hours at HL.

SL/HL core
 Topic 1: System fundamentals (20 hours)
 Topic 2: Computer organization (6 hours)
 Topic 3: Networks (9 hours)
 Topic 4: Computational thinking, problem-solving and programming (45 hours)

HL extension
 Topic 5: Abstract data structures (23 hours)
 Topic 6: Resource management (8 hours)
 Topic 7: Control (14 hours)

Options
 Option A: Databases (30/45 hours)
 Option B: Modelling and simulation (30/45 hours)
 Option C: Web science (30/45 hours)
 Option D: Object-oriented programming (30/45 hours)

Assessment
There are three external assessment components and two internal assessment components.

External assessment
Unlike other Group 4 subjects, calculators are not permitted in any computer science examination.
 Paper 1 (SL: 70 raw marks contributing 45% of the course, 1 hour 30 minutes; HL: 100 raw marks contributing 40% of the course, 2 hours 10 minutes) consists of:
 Section A (about 30 minutes): Compulsory short answer questions on the SL/HL core and (for HL) the HL extension. Some questions are common to HL and SL. The maximum raw mark for this section is 25.
 Section B (60 minutes for SL, 100 minutes for HL): 3 (SL) or 5 (HL) compulsory structured questions on the SL/HL core and the HL extension. Some questions may be common to HL and SL. The maximum raw marks for this section is 45 (SL) or 75 (HL).
 Paper 2 (SL: 45 raw marks contributing 25% of the course, 1 hour; HL: 65 raw marks contributing 20% of the course, 1 hour 20 minutes) consists of 2 to 5 (SL) or 3 to 7 (HL) compulsory questions based on the option studied. For HL, questions in section A (45 marks) consists of the core of the option, which may be common to the SL paper, and questions in section B (20 marks) are based on the extension of the option.
 Paper 3 (HL only: 30 raw marks contributing 20% of the course, 1 hour) consists of 4 compulsory questions based on the pre-seen case study annually issued by the IBO.

Internal assessment
Both SL and HL candidates must complete the following:
 A computational solution (30 hours, 34 raw marks). Candidates will need to develop a solution for a client to a problem or an unanswered question. This can be in the form of an entirely new system, or an addition of functionality to an existing system. Candidates will need to select, identify and work closely with an adviser, a third-party that can assist the candidate throughout the creation of the product. Candidates will need to complete an electronic HTML cover sheet (not assessed), the product and the documentation of the product (maximum 2000 words in total), including a 2 to 7-minute video showing the functionality of the product. The entire solution and documentation is marked against 5 criteria and is digitally compressed in a ZIP file and submitted for moderation.
 The group 4 project (10 hours, 6 raw marks). Candidates will need to complete an interdisciplinary project with other science students. This is marked against the personal skills criterion.
Both components carry a weightage of 30% (SL) or 20% (HL) of the computer science course.

Group 4 project
All students of the Diploma Programme in any of these subjects, with the exception of environmental systems and societies, will compulsorily complete an inter-disciplinary and collaborative investigation called the Group 4 project. The Group 4 project assessment is included in the internal assessment marks. Students undertaking two or more group 4 courses will obtain the same mark for all of the courses.

Footnotes

References

External links

Diploma Programme curriculum Group 4: experimental sciences
2400 Inteactive IB Physics Resources 
Environmental systems and societies subject outline
Computer science subject outline
Student developed IB Design Technology website

International Baccalaureate